One More Time was a Canadian music television series which aired on CBC Television from 1969 to 1970.

Premise
This Montreal-produced series tended to feature blues styles. Visiting artists included Ed Evanko, John P. Hammond, John Lee Hooker, Lonnie Johnson, Johnny Nash, and Josh White. Series regulars were American singer Gilbert Price and the Canadian music group 3's a Crowd whose members included Bruce Cockburn, Colleen Peterson, Brent Titcomb, Trevor Veitch, and David Wiffen.

Scheduling
This half-hour series was broadcast as follows:

See also
 Music Hop
 Let's Go
 Where It's At (TV series)

References

External links
 
 Article at broadcasting-history.com

CBC Television original programming
1969 Canadian television series debuts
1972 Canadian television series endings